Andaç is a village in the Uludere District of Şırnak Province in Turkey. The village is populated by Kurds from the Kaşuran tribe and had a population of 1,826 in 2021.

The hamlets of Arslanlı and Yarma are attached to Andaç.

History
Halmūn (today called Andaç) was historically inhabited by Assyrian people and located in the Lower Tyari district in the Hakkari region. It is identified with the village of Halmon recorded in the diocese of Beth Nuhadra. It had one church and was served as part of the diocese of the Patriarch of the Church of the East. According to the English missionary George Percy Badger, the village was inhabited by 50 Assyrian families in 1850, all of whom belonged to the Church of the East and were served by two priests. By 1877, the village's population had grown to 60 families with one priest when visited by Edward Lewes Cutts. Halmūn was destroyed by the Ottoman Army in June 1915 amidst the Sayfo. Survivors were later resettled at Cham Sus in Iraq.

References
Notes

Citations

Bibliography

Historic Assyrian communities in Turkey
Villages in Uludere District
Kurdish settlements in Şırnak Province
Places of the Assyrian genocide